Shalqun (also Romanized as Shālqūn; also known as Shelgun) is a village in Molla Yaqub Rural District, in the Central District of Sarab County, East Azerbaijan Province, Iran. At the 2006 census, its population was 909, in 239 families.

References 

Populated places in Sarab County